Jimmy Mac (26 August 1902 – 18 May 1984) was a Scottish actor. He was best known for playing Warwick in the long running department store sitcom  Are You Being Served? He also appeared in Dad's Army, The Invisible Man, Nutcracker, Keep off the Grass, Jane, Hi-De-Hi, Grange Hill, Thomas and Sarah, Moll Flanders, Churchill's People and many other television shows. Prior to television, Jimmy was a stand-up comedian in the early 1950s and 1960s at Jackson Earle's Melody Inn Review at the Floral Pavilion, New Brighton, Wirral.
He died on 18 May 1984, at the age of 81.

References

External links
 

1902 births
1984 deaths
20th-century English male actors
English male television actors
English stand-up comedians
20th-century British comedians